Icheon Sangmu Football Club was a South Korean football club based in Icheon. They played in the Korea National League.

Season-by-season records

Korea National League

See also 
 List of football clubs in South Korea
 Sangju Sangmu FC

Defunct football clubs in South Korea
Association football clubs established in 1999
1999 establishments in South Korea
Association football clubs disestablished in 2005
2005 disestablishments in South Korea
Korea National League clubs